Dale's Right is a historic home located near Cambridge, Dorchester County, Maryland, United States. It is one of the few houses which falls under the strict definition of a telescope house, where each section is narrower and shorter than the previous one. Each of the three sections appear to date from the first third of the 19th century, about 1830 to 1840, and they are two, one and a half, and one stories, respectively.

Dale's Right was listed on the National Register of Historic Places in 1979.

References

External links
, including photo from 1975, at Maryland Historical Trust

Houses in Dorchester County, Maryland
Houses on the National Register of Historic Places in Maryland
Houses completed in 1840
Cambridge, Maryland
National Register of Historic Places in Dorchester County, Maryland